The Department of Labour was a part of the Government of New Brunswick.  It was charged with the enforcement of labour standards and facilitating relations between employers and employees in New Brunswick. This department was separated from the Department of Health in 1944. The department was renamed Labour and Human Resources in 1983 and then Labour and Manpower in 1985. From 1991 to 1998, this department's functions were incorporated in the Department of Advanced Education and Labour.  In 1998, that department's functions were split between the Department of Labour and the Department of Education. In 2000, most of the department's functions were transferred to the new Department of Training and Employment Development.

Ministers

References 
 List of ministers and deputy ministers by department, New Brunswick Legislative Library  (pdf)

Defunct New Brunswick government departments and agencies